Cimex lectularius is a species of Cimicidae (bed bugs). Its primary hosts are humans, and it is one of the world's major "nuisance pests".

Although bed bugs can be infected with at least 28 human pathogens, no studies have found that the insects are capable of transmitting any of these to humans. They have been found with methicillin-resistant Staphylococcus aureus (MRSA) and with vancomycin-resistant Enterococcus faecium (VRE), but the significance of this is still unknown.

Investigations into potential transmission of HIV, MRSA, hepatitis B, hepatitis C, and hepatitis E have not shown that bed bugs can spread these diseases. However, there is some evidence that arboviruses may be transmissible.

Bed bug bites or cimicosis may lead to a range of skin manifestations from no visible effects to prominent blisters. Effects include skin rashes, psychological effects, and allergic symptoms.

Occurrence and distribution 

C. lectularius is found all over the world in almost every area that has been settled by humans.
In the past, bed bugs were particularly an affliction of the poor and occurred in mass shelters. However, in the early part of the modern resurgence it was the tourist areas that were impacted. Today, bed bugs have conquered quite diverse locations, ranging from hospitals and hotels, to trains, cruise ships and even airplanes. Most commonly, bed bugs travel as stowaways in luggage, although they can be transferred via furnishing and other belongings, as well by spreading to adjoining properties. Since there are no mandatory reporting requirements, exact figures on the occurrence of bed bugs are unknown and, due to the stigma often associated, many infestations are simply not reported.

Life cycle

If feeding regularly, a female bed bug can lay between two and three eggs per day throughout her adult lifetime, which may last several months, allowing one female to produce hundreds of offspring under optimal conditions. The tiny (<1 mm) yellowish-white eggs are vase-shaped and are laid within harborages where the insects rest between blood meals and spend virtually all of their time: although parasitic, they do not reside on their hosts and only contact them briefly for blood meals. Eggs typically hatch within 10 days at room temperature, but become non-viable below . Cimex lectularius goes through five immature life stages that each require a blood meal to develop and move on to the next stage. The life cycle occurs more rapidly at warmer temperatures, and more slowly at lower ones. Once the egg hatches, the larval form must take one blood meal per week as it completes each of its five to six molts. Once it completes the final molt, it will have reached the adult stage and can reproduce. Meals take several minutes to consume, and occur only under the correct conditions: darkness, warmth, and carbon dioxide. C. lectularius typically feed on hosts when they are asleep, they tend to feed exclusively on humans, and are obligate blood feeders. Newly hatched nymphs must consume a blood meal within two to three days or will die of starvation, whereas an adult can live for as long as six months between feedings.

References 

Cimicidae
Bugs described in 1758
Taxa named by Carl Linnaeus
Bed bug